Nomreh-ye Do or Nomreh Do may refer to:
 Nomreh-ye Do, Haftgel
 Nomreh Do, Omidiyeh